Changankulangara is a small village in Oachira Panchayath in Kollam district of Kerala, India. Its Changankulangara Sree Mahadevar Temple is one of the ancient temples in South India and one of the 108 Shiva Temples installed by the Lord Parasurama.

References

Villages in Kollam district